Robin Diallo is an American diplomat who is the current Deputy Chief of Mission at the U.S. Embassy in Haiti, serving under President Donald Trump.

Career 
In her early career in public diplomacy, Diallo served as a volunteer for the American Peace Corps in Niger from 1984 to 1988. From 2014 to 2016, she served as Director of Public Diplomacy in the Bureau of East Asian and Pacific Affairs of the U.S. State Department in Washington, DC. She later served as the Minister Counselor for Public Affairs at the American Embassy in Baghdad, Iraq.

On August 25, 2017, Diallo became the United States Ambassador to Haiti (chargé d'affaires), upon the departure of Charge d' affaires Brian Shukan. She will step down from office upon the installment of Michele Sison as permanent Ambassador, at which point Diallo will become Deputy Chief of Mission to the Haitian Embassy.

In January 2018, after U.S. President Donald Trump questioned why the U.S. was accepting refugees from Haiti, the Haitian government summoned Diallo to meet with the Haitian president so they could voice their disapproval.

References 

Year of birth missing (living people)
Living people
University of Southern California alumni
Michigan State University alumni
Ambassadors of the United States to Haiti
United States Department of State officials
American women ambassadors
21st-century American women